Duke of York's may refer to:

 Duke of York Inn, Toronto, a pub/restaurant in Toronto, Canada
 Duke of York Rural LLG, New Britain, Papua New Guinea

United Kingdom
 Duke of York, Bloomsbury, a pub in London, England
 Duke of York, Leysters, a pub in Herefordshire, England
 Duke of York's Greek Light Infantry Regiment, a British Army regiment active in 1810–16
 Duke of York's Headquarters, a former military barracks in Chelsea, London
 Duke of York's Picture House, Brighton, a cinema in Brighton, England
 Duke of York's Royal Military School, a school in Dover
 Duke of York's Theatre, a theatre in London

See also
 Duke of York
 Duke of York Island (disambiguation)
 The Grand Old Duke of York